Rudolf Bohren (Grindelwald, 22 March 1920 - Dossenheim, 1 February 2010) was a Swiss Protestant (practical) theologian. Bohren became known for his pneumatological approach to homiletics.

Biography 
Bohren studied theology in Bern and Basel, especially with Eduard Thurneysen and Karl Barth. In 1952 he wrote a dissertation on the issue of church discipline in the New Testament by Oscar Cullmann. On May 16, 1945, he was admitted as a pastor to the Reformed Preacher Community in Bern. From 1945 to 1958 he was a pastor in Bern, in Holderbank (Aargau) and in Arlesheim, a suburb of Basel. The experiences in these mutually different communities have shaped his scientific work. In 1958 he was appointed professor of practical theology at the Kirchliche Hochschule Wuppertal. In 1972 he was appointed to the Kirchliche Hochschule Berlin, and in 1974 to the University of Heidelberg where he set up a preaching research center.

His first wife tragically died of suicide, which led to the publication of a poignant sermon collection, entitled Tröstungen (Consolations). In 1971 he published Predightlehre (sermon teaching). The uniqueness of this book lies, among other things, in its poetic approach, the use of non-theological literature, as well as the development of a sermon based on pneumatology.

References

1920 births
2010 deaths
Swiss Protestants
20th-century Protestant theologians
Swiss Calvinist and Reformed ministers
Swiss Calvinist and Reformed theologians